Alaba Jonathan (born 1 June 1992 Calabar, Nigeria) is a Nigerian Football-player.

Career

Development 
Alaba Jonathan began her career in the youth of the Navy Angels. After she failed to qualify for the senior team of the Navy Angels, she moved to the Pelican Stars in spring 2010 where she remains under contract.

National team 
Jonathan is a member of Nigeria's national team and has played at least once for the team. Jonathan represented her home country as a third goalkeeper at the 2011 FIFA Women's World Cup in Germany. Previously in 2010, she participated in the U-20 World Cup for the Nigeria U-20's.

References

External links

 

1992 births
Living people
Nigerian women's footballers
People from Calabar
2011 FIFA Women's World Cup players
Nigeria women's international footballers
Women's association football goalkeepers
2019 FIFA Women's World Cup players
Bayelsa Queens F.C. players
21st-century Nigerian women